Pollenia is a species of cluster fly in the family Polleniidae.

Distribution
Channel Islands, France, Slovakia, Spain, Switzerland.

References

Polleniidae
Insects described in 1835
Diptera of Europe